Carlo Bo (25 January 1911 – 21 July 2001) was an Italian poet, literary critic, distinguished humanist, professor and senator for life from 1984.

Biography 
Bo was born on January 25, 1911, in Sestri Levante, Italy.

From 1929 to 1934 he attended the humanities school at the University of Florence, moving from the study of classical literature to modern literature, discipline in which het took his Laurea in 1934.

Bo wrote his first book in 1935, a monograph on Jacques Riviere. Before the Second World War, in the year 1936, he published an essay on the literary magazine Il Frontespizio which gathered together the most relevant poets like Mario Luzi, and contemporary artists from Ottone Rosai to Giorgio Morandi and Quinto Martini. His essay was titled "Letteratura come vita (Literature as a way of life)", containing the theoretical-methodological fundamentals of hermetic poetry.

In 1939 he began teaching French literature at the University of Urbino. Bo was the rector of University of Urbino from 1947 until his death, for more than 50 years.

Bo was appointed a senator for life on July 18, 1984, and has been a member of several parties. He served with the Christian Democrats from 1987 to 1994; the Italian People's Party from 1994 to 2001; and The Daisy from 2001 until his death later that year.

Bo died in Genoa on July 21, 2001.

Legacy 
His focus on hermetic poetry was to become a strong poetical movement comprising important poets, such as Salvatore Quasimodo and Eugenio Montale, both of whom would go on to receive the Nobel Prize in Literature (1959, 1975). Carlo Bo himself, however, never did and, at the age of 86, was rendered incapable of understanding Dario Fo's 1997 receipt of the Nobel Prize in Literature, saying "I must be too old to understand. What does this mean? That everything changes, even literature has changed."

Bo is credited with writing roughly 40 books and would also found the national Gentile da Fabriano prize.

External links 

 Italian Senate Page

References

1911 births
2001 deaths
Christian Democracy (Italy) politicians
Italian People's Party (1994) politicians
Democracy is Freedom – The Daisy politicians
Italian life senators
People from the Province of Genoa
Senators of Legislature IX of Italy
Senators of Legislature X of Italy
Senators of Legislature XI of Italy
Senators of Legislature XII of Italy
Senators of Legislature XIII of Italy
Senators of Legislature XIV of Italy
Writers from Liguria
Academic staff of the University of Urbino
Politicians of Liguria